Discos Intolerancia (in Spanish: Intolerancia Records) is an independent record label based in Mexico City, Mexico. Established in 1996, was founded by Mexican rock and jazz musicians aiming to have an alternative label to mainstream circuit.

History 
Discos Intolerancia was established in 1996 by Gerardo Gerry Rosado, Mexican musician and producer of Consumatum est, a famous rock band in 90s. He had as motivation the recording and distribution of artists of different genres related to rock, jazz and improvisation and expressions around these genres, which have no place in large companies. The first major release of the label was Merlina from La Gusana Ciega. Then, the first artist to been certified Gold in Mexico for Intolerancia was Carla Morrison's first album Déjenme llorar.

From 2006  Intolerancia make an alliance to expand the reach of their catalogue in Latin America.

In addition to the recording and publishing of albums, Discos Intolerancia performs activities in support of the musicians it represents, such as participating in music festivals as SXSW, Glastonbury, Rock al Parque, And Vive Latino. In this latter the label curates an artistic program at Carpa Intolerante stage; they also collaborate with Ibero 90.9 radio station with acoustic sessions recorded at Clickaporte show.

Anthropologist Néstor García Canclini called the label a trendsetter in Mexico, and the specialized press has referred Intolerancia as "a reference in the musical avant-garde scene".

Roster 
 Alex Otaola
 Alonso Arreola
 Carla Morrison
 Dapuntobeat
 Descartes a Kant
 Fratta
 Guillotina
 Kill Aniston
 Juan Cirerol
 Juan Pablo Villa
 Los Dorados
 Los Ezquisitos
 Max Capote
 Motor
 Paté de fuá
 San Pascualito Rey
 Salón Victoria
 Santa Sabina
 Sonex
 Telefunka
 Troker

References 

Mexican independent record labels
Record labels established in 1996